Jorge Osorio Reyes (born 26 June 1977) is a Chilean professional football referee, who officiates the Campeonato Nacional of Chile and the Copa Chile as well as other various South American tournaments.  Osorio is a CONMEBOL category 2 referee.  He was appointed as a FIFA referee in 2009.

Tournaments officiated 

Osorio's first international tournament was the 2006 Copa Sudamericana in which he officiated a game between Chilean clubs Huachipato and Colo-Colo.  In this match, Osorio issued 2 red cards to Huachipato and awarded a penalty to Colo-Colo who went on to win the match 2-1.

Osorio officiated 5 games at the 2007 South American Under-17 Football Championship including 2 group stage games and 3 final stage games.

He also officiated 4 games at the 2009 South American Under-17 Football Championship which included 3 group stage games and 1 final stage game.

The Copa Chile final of the 2008-09 season between Deportes Ovalle and Universidad de Concepción was officiated by Osorio.

Osorio officiated 1st round games at the 2009 Copa Sudamericana and the 2010 Copa Sudamericana.  In 2010, he also officiated 2 group stage games in the Copa Libertadores and officiated 2 group stage games and the final of the 2010 Tournoi Espoirs de Toulon.

In 2011, Osorio officiated games at the Under-20 Copa Sudamericana and the 2011 Copa Libertadores.  Osorio officiated games at the 2015 Copa Libertadores and the 2015 Copa Sudamericana.  In 2016, he officiated games at the Under-20 Copa Libertadores including a semifinal.  He also officiated two friendlies in 2016 between Argentina and Honduras in May and Argentina and Bolivia in June.

Statistics

Notes

References

1977 births
Living people
Chilean football referees